Khub Yaran-e Olya (also Romanized as Khūb Yārān-e ‘Olyā; also known as Khūb Yārān and Khūb Yārān-e Bālā) is a village in Jalalvand Rural District, Firuzabad District, Kermanshah County, Kermanshah Province, Iran. At the 2006 census, its population was 296, in 58 families.

References 

Populated places in Kermanshah County